The  (Resort Super Express) is an electric multiple unit (EMU) train type operated between 1991 and March 2012 by the private railway operator Odakyu Electric Railway on Asagiri limited express services in Japan.

Operations
Up until 16 March 2012, the 20000 series RSE operated mainly between Odakyu's  terminus in Tokyo and JR Central's Numazu Station on the Gotemba Line. On weekends, some trains operated between Shinjuku Station and Hakone-Yumoto Station.

Formations

The two 7-car sets are formed as follows, with car 1 at the Odawara and Numazu end.

Cars 1, 2, 6, and 7 each have one scissors type pantograph.

Interior
All passenger saloons are designated no-smoking. cars 2 and 6 are equipped with toilets.

History

The first 20000 series RSE set was delivered in December 1990, followed by the second in January 1991. They entered service on Asagiri services from 16 March 1991.

In 1992, the 20000 series RSE was awarded the Blue Ribbon Award, presented annually in Japan by the Japan Railfan Club for railway vehicles voted as being the most outstanding design of the year.

Withdrawal
The 20000 series sets were withdrawn on 16 March 2012, and replaced by 60000 series MSE 6-car sets on Asagiri services from the start of the revised timetable on 17 March 2012. End car 20301 of set 20001 was moved to Kitami Depot for storage alongside set 20002 in September 2012, and the remaining cars of set 20001 were cut up.

Resale

The remaining set, 20002, was moved to the Nippon Sharyo factory in Toyokawa, Aichi, in November 2013, where it was reformed and converted to become a 3-car Fujikyu 8000 series set for use on Fuji Kyuko Fujisan Limited Express services from July 2014.

References

External links

 Odakyu Romancecar Lineup 
 Odakyu "last running" site 

Electric multiple units of Japan
20000 series RSE
Kawasaki multiple units
Double-decker EMUs
1500 V DC multiple units of Japan
Train-related introductions in 1991